Bas Koeten Racing is a Dutch auto racing team based in Westwoud, Netherlands. The team currently races in the Supercar Challenge. Having previously raced in the Acceleration 2014 & TCR International Series amongst others.

TCR International Series

SEAT León Cup Racer (2015–)
After having raced in the Acceleration 2014 in 2014, the team will enter the 2015 TCR International Series season with Bas Schouten driving an SEAT León Cup Racer.

External links
 Bas Koeten Racing official website

References

Dutch auto racing teams
TCR International Series teams
Porsche Supercup teams
Auto racing teams established in 2003